Glenda Chong is a Singaporean news presenter. She is currently the host of the news segment, News Tonight, of CNA by Mediacorp.

Early life and education 
Chong was born to a Hakka father and Peranakan mother.

Chong attended CHIJ Katong Convent and Royal Melbourne Institute of Technology, and graduated summa cum laude from Boston University with a Bachelor of Science in Broadcast Journalism and holds a Masters of Social Sciences (International Studies) from the National University of Singapore.

Career 
Chong previously served as Channel NewsAsia's China Correspondent for three years in Shanghai. Highlights of her work include reporting on the 2008 Beijing Olympics, covering the devastating aftermath of the 2008 Sichuan earthquake, and the 2010 Shanghai World Expo.

At the Asian Television Awards in 2001, she was named Best News Anchor, along with her co-presenter Melvin Yong. She was also awarded Best Presenter at MediaCorp’s Annual Excellence Awards in 2005.

Major breaking news stories that she has helmed include the 2006 Thai Coup and the 2004 Asian tsunami. She also anchored ‘live’ election programmes such as Taiwan’s 2004 presidential election and Channel NewsAsia’s ‘live’ election night specials for Malaysia’s 2004 and 2008 General Elections.

References 

Living people
National University of Singapore alumni
Boston University College of Communication alumni
Singaporean journalists
Singaporean people of Hakka descent
Singaporean women journalists
1972 births